Member for Kalgoorlie may refer to:
 the member of the Australian House of Representatives for the Division of Kalgoorlie
 the member of the Western Australian Legislative Assembly for the Electoral district of Kalgoorlie